is a Japanese footballer currently playing as a right back or a defensive midfielder for Deinze on loan from Urawa Reds.

Career
In January 2023, Miyamoto joined Challenger Pro League club Deinze on loan until the end of the season.

Career statistics

Club
.

Notes

Honours

Club
Urawa Red Diamonds
Japanese Super Cup: 2022

References

1999 births
Living people
People from Nerima
Association football people from Tokyo
Japanese footballers
Association football midfielders
Ryutsu Keizai University alumni
Urawa Red Diamonds players
K.M.S.K. Deinze players
J1 League players
Japanese expatriate footballers
Japanese expatriate sportspeople in Belgium
Expatriate footballers in Belgium